Jonathan Peter Jackson (June 23, 1953 – August 7, 1970) was an American youth, who died of gunshot wounds suffered during his armed invasion of a California courthouse. At age 17, Jackson stormed the Marin County Courthouse with automatic weapons, kidnapping Superior Court Judge Harold Haley, prosecutor Gary Thomas, and three jurors.

In an ensuing shootout, Jackson and Judge Haley were killed, along with two inmates already in the courtroom, who had readily joined the attack; prosecutor Thomas was paralyzed and one juror was seriously injured. The guns that Jackson used were registered to political activist Angela Davis, who previously formed a committee supporting the Soledad Brothers. Davis stood trial for alleged involvement in the kidnapping and was acquitted of all charges in June 1972.

Personal life
Jackson was the youngest of five children born to Lester and Georgia Bea Jackson. Raised in Pasadena, California, he attended St Andrew's School from 1965 to 1967 for grades seven and eight, La Salle High School for ninth grade (1967–68), and then Blair High School through his junior year.

Political activism

Black Panthers
George Jackson includes passages in his 1971 book, Blood in My Eye, which he attributes to his brother Jonathan. These passages figure prominently in the development of the elder Jackson's theory of revolutionary praxis.

Jackson had occasionally worked as a bodyguard for political activist Angela Davis. Davis would later endorse the "spirit" of Jackson.

Marin County incident

On August 7, 1970, Jackson brought a satchel containing three automatic firearms, registered to Davis, into the Marin County Hall of Justice, where Judge Haley was presiding over the trial of San Quentin inmate James McClain.

Once inside Judge Haley's courtroom, Jackson drew an automatic gun, and, aided by McClain and Black Panther inmates Ruchell Cinque Magee and William Arthur Christmas, took Judge Haley as well as Deputy District Attorney Gary Thomas and three female jurors hostage.

They proudly encouraged responding journalists to document their actions as they loaded the hostages into a rented van. Responding San Quentin prison guards fired on the van that Jackson was driving in an attempt to end the attack. During the shootout, Jonathan Jackson, Christmas, McClain, and Judge Haley were killed, while Magee and Deputy District Attorney Thomas were seriously injured.

Jackson's son, Jonathan Jackson Jr., was born eight and a half months after his father's death. A monument on the premises to Judge Haley was the target of a follow-up attack perpetrated by the Weather Underground terrorist network in October of the same year.

In popular culture

Music

Nas pays tribute to George and Jonathan Jackson in his song "Testify" from his untitled album.
Hasan Salaam references to George and Jonathan Jackson in the song "Get High Riddum" on the album Tales of the Lost Tribe: Hidden Jewels (i.e. "I fight for my freedom like George and John Jackson").
Dead Prez mentions Jonathan Jackson in the songs "I have a dream too" and "Over" from their mixtape "Revolutionary But Gangsta Grillz "
Chris Iijima of the band, Yellow Pearl, wrote a song  "Jonathan Jackson" on the album A Grain of Sand: Music for the Struggle by Asians in America.
(Jeffery Cain) wrote and recorded the song "Whispering Thunder" on his similarly named album in 1971 a powerful message about the event and its meaning.
Hussein Fatal mentions George and Jonathan Jackson in the song "Dumpin'" on the posthumous 2Pac album Pac's Life.
2Pac's song Soulja's Story on his 2Pacalypse Now album  is a reference to George and Jonathan Jackson.

Film
The 2007 film Black August about Jackson's elder brother George also dramatizes the Marin County incident.

References

External links

 FBI Docs Jonathan Jackson FBI File

1953 births
1970 deaths
Place of birth missing
Blair High School (Pasadena, California) alumni
American kidnappers
Criminals of the San Francisco Bay Area
Deaths by firearm in California
Activists for African-American civil rights